Tympanocryptis petersi, the lined earless dragon, is a species of agama found in South Australia. The specific epithet, petersi, honours Wilhelm Carl Hartwig Peters, who described the genus and type species, Tympanocryptis lineata.

References

petersi
Endemic fauna of Australia
Reptiles of South Australia
Agamid lizards of Australia
Taxa named by Jane Melville
Taxa named by Mark Norman Hutchinson
Reptiles described in 2019